Gerald M. "Jerry" Levin (born May 6, 1939) is an American mass-media businessman. Levin was involved in brokering the merger between AOL and Time Warner in 2000, at the height of the dot-com bubble, a merger which was ultimately disadvantageous to Time Warner and described as "the biggest train wreck in the history of corporate America."

Early life and education
Levin was born in Philadelphia, Pennsylvania to a Jewish family of Russian and Romanian origins. His father was a "butter-and-eggs man" and his mother was a piano teacher. He lived as a child in the suburbs of Philadelphia, in Upper Darby and then Overbrook Hills. After graduating second in his class at Lower Merion High School, where he was named to the Honor Society, he attended Haverford College. He graduated from the University of Pennsylvania Law School in 1963.

Career and later life
In 2000, he claimed that "media will become the dominant industry in the 21st century, and the global media will become even stronger than the government." Levin spent most of his career with Time Inc. (later Time Warner, then AOL Time Warner), starting there in 1972 as a programming executive for the new Home Box Office (HBO) and eventually becoming CEO of the corporation after the ouster of his nemesis Nicholas J. Nicholas Jr. Interviewed by the journalist Nina Munk, Levin would later admit: "It is absolutely true that I plotted the departure of Nick Nicholas after working with him for 20 years. And I don't have any justification for it other than I am a strange person." Levin is best known for orchestrating with Steve Case the disastrous merger between AOL and Time Warner in 2000, at the height of the dot-com bubble, which destroyed $200 billion in shareholder value as the bubble collapsed. Following the deal, CNBC named him as one of the "Worst American CEOs of All Time." According to The New York Times, the merger is used by business schools as a case study of "the worst [deal] in history." In her book about the deal, Munk writes, "The disastrous merger...epitomizes the culture of corporate America and Wall Street in the late 1990s. It records the climate in executive suites, where as long as a company's stock price kept going up and up, a CEO was all-powerful, like a king with divine rights."

Whereas Levin had once been "perhaps the most powerful media executive in the world,", he largely disappeared from public view after the collapse of AOL Time Warner. In 2007, he was reported by New York (magazine) to be "presiding director of Moonview Sanctuary, a “holistic healing institute” with a full-time staff of fewer than twenty people" founded by his new wife, Laurie Ann Perlman, a clinical psychologist. In 2013, he was named chairman of a start-up called Elation Media, raising $150,000 of seed funding, according to Crowdfund Insider, to launch a "live and on-demand service" with programming topics that include "alternative medicine, world peace, visionary art, personal growth and the environment." As of July 2022, Elation TV does not appear to have launched.

Personal life
Levin has been married three times and fathered five children. His first wife was Carol Needleman, whom he met at summer camp in the 1960s; they divorced in 1970. In 1970, he married Barbara J. Riley; they divorced in 2003. His third wife was Laurie Ann Perlman, a Hollywood agent turned psychologist who had been formerly married to Jack Rapke; they divorced in 2020.

Murder of Jonathan Levin
One of his children, Jonathan Levin, a 31-year-old high school English teacher at Taft High School in the Bronx, was murdered on May 31, 1997 during a robbery by one of his former students. The student, Corey Arthur, was convicted of second-degree murder and sentenced to the maximum allowed term of 25 years to life in prison in November 1998, with the judge concluding that Arthur had taken sadistic pleasure in the crime and shown no remorse. A purported accomplice, Montoun Hart, was acquitted on the same charges in February 1999. While Hart had written a confession, jurors were not able to find out how it was obtained and felt it was unreliable.

The murder occurred after Jonathan had mentioned in the classroom that his father was Time Warner head Gerald Levin. Prosecutors said Arthur and Hart, assuming that Jonathan was wealthy, stole Jonathan's bank card and tortured him to obtain the account's PIN, obtaining about $800 from the account.

Jonathan Levin High School for Media and Communications in The Bronx, New York City, is named after the murdered teacher.

Further reading
 Munk, Nina, Fools Rush In: Steve Case, Jerry Levin, and the Unmaking of AOL Time Warner (HarperCollins, 2004) 
 Klein, Alec, Stealing Time: Steve Case, Jerry Levin, and the Collapse of AOL Time Warner (Simon & Schuster, 2003)

References

External links
Gerald Levin's page at The Museum of Broadcast Communications' website

Forbes Magazine article about Levin's resignation from AOL Time Warner
October 20, 1998 CNN.com news article discussing opening statements at the trial of Jonathan Levin's then suspected murderer
Moonview Sanctuary: Gerald Levin's holistic treatment center based in Santa Monica, California

Living people
1939 births
American chief executives in the media industry
American people of Russian-Jewish descent
American people of Romanian-Jewish descent
American mass media owners
HBO people
Warner Bros. Discovery people
Jewish American philanthropists
Businesspeople from Philadelphia
Haverford College alumni
University of Pennsylvania Law School alumni
21st-century American Jews